This is a list of colleges of natural resources around the world, offering bachelor's, master's or doctoral degrees in natural resource science, natural resource management, or related fields.

Austria 
University of Natural Resources and Life Sciences, Vienna

Bhutan 
College of Natural Resources, Royal University of Bhutan, Lobesa, Punakha District

Canada 
 Faculty of Natural Resources Management, Lakehead University
 Faculty of Natural Resources Management, University of Northern British Columbia

Ethiopia 
 Wondo Genet College of Forestry and Natural Resources, Hawassa University

Ghana 
 College of Agriculture and Natural Resources, Kwame Nkrumah University of Science and Technology
 Department of Renewable Natural Resources, University for Development Studies

India 
 College of Fisheries, Mangalore, Karnataka

Iran
 Gorgan University of Agricultural Sciences and Natural Resources

Norway 
 Department of Ecology and Natural Resources,  Norwegian University of Life Sciences

Philippines 
 College of Agricultural Sciences and Natural Resources, Caraga State University
 University of the Philippines Los Baños College of Forestry and Natural Resources
 College of Forestry and Natural Resources, Visayas State University

Sudan
 College of Natural Resources and Environmental Studies, University of Juba
 Faculty of Natural Resources and Environmental Studies, University of Kordofan

Taiwan 
 Department of Forestry and Natural Resources, National Chiayi University
 Department of Forestry and Natural Resources, National Ilan University

United Kingdom
 School of the Environment, Natural Resources and Geography, Bangor University

United States

Northeast
 Division of Forestry, Natural Resources, and Recreation, Paul Smith's College
College of Agriculture, Health, and Natural Resources, University of Connecticut
 College of Natural Sciences, Forestry and Agriculture, University of Maine
 College of Agriculture and Natural Resources, University of Maryland
 Department of Natural Resources Conservation, University of Massachusetts Amherst
 Department of Natural Resources and the Environment, University of New Hampshire
 Department of Forest and Natural Resources Management, SUNY College of Environmental Science and Forestry
 Rubenstein School of Environment and Natural Resources, The University of Vermont

Midwest
 Department of Natural Resources and Environmental Sciences, University of Illinois at Urbana–Champaign
 Department of Forestry and Natural Resources, Purdue University
 Department of Natural Resource Ecology and Management, Iowa State University
 School of Natural Resources & Environment, University of Michigan
 College of Food, Agricultural and Natural Resource Sciences, University of Minnesota
 College of Agriculture, Food and Natural Resources, University of Missouri
 School of Natural Resources, Ohio State University
 College of Natural Resources, University of Wisconsin–Stevens Point
 School of Natural Resources, University of Nebraska-Lincoln
 School of Natural Resource Sciences, North Dakota State University

South
 School of Renewable Natural Resources, Louisiana State University
 College of Natural Resources, North Carolina State University
 Department of Natural Resource Ecology and Management, Oklahoma State University
 Daniel B. Warnell School of Forestry and Natural Resources, University of Georgia
 College of Natural Resources and Environment, Virginia Tech
 College of Forest Resources, Mississippi State University

West
 College of Forestry, Oregon State University
 Department of Natural Resources Management, California Polytechnic State University
 College of Agricultural Sciences and Natural Resources, Oklahoma State University
 College of Agricultural Sciences and Natural Resources, Texas Tech University
 College of Natural Resources, University of California, Berkeley
 College of Natural Resources, Department of Forest Ecology and Biogeosciences, University of Idaho
 The Helga Otto Haub School of Environment and Natural Resources, University of Wyoming
 College of Agricultural, Human, and Natural Resource Sciences, Washington State University
 Quinney College of Natural Resources, Utah State University
 Warner College of Natural Resources, Colorado State University

See also 
 List of agricultural universities and colleges
 List of forestry universities and colleges
 List of schools of mines

References 

Colleges
Natural resources
Natural resources